Tales of Deltora is a fictional novel written by Emily Rodda and illustrated by Marc McBride. It is a chronicle of ancient stories from the Deltora Quest universe including how the evil Shadow Lord came to be, and how the great Adin obtained the seven gems from each of the tribes to form the Belt of Deltora. It was published by Scholastic in October 2006.

In-universe, Tales of Deltora is a book written by the palace librarian Josef, with one half of it being made up of the ancient fairy tales of the Jalis people known as the Tenna Birdsong Tales, which tell the ancient history of Deltora, and the other half being said to be based on historical writings about King Adin, the first king of Deltora, found in The Deltora Annals, a collection of important history books about the kingdom featured in the book series. Tales of Deltora was featured in Deltora Quest 2 and Deltora Quest 3.

References

2006 novels
Deltora